The Ed Cusick House, located west of Springfield, Kentucky, on Bearwallow Rd., was listed on the National Register of Historic Places in 1989.

It is a three-bay two-story log house with an ell, built in the second quarter of the 1800s.

References

Houses on the National Register of Historic Places in Kentucky
National Register of Historic Places in Washington County, Kentucky
Houses in Washington County, Kentucky
Log buildings and structures on the National Register of Historic Places in Kentucky
Log houses in the United States